Alan Rhodes is the name of:

Alan Rhodes (footballer)
Alan Rhodes (rugby league)
Alan Rhodes (rugby league, born in Bradford)
Alan Rhodes (table tennis)